Cecil Egerton Dixon (21 July 1903 – 3 March 1973) was a Scottish first-class cricketer. A right-handed batsman, he made his first-class debut for Hampshire in the 1926 County Championship, playing two matches against Gloucestershire and Derbyshire.

Dixon died at Rye, Sussex on 3 March 1973.

External links
Cecil Dixon at Cricinfo
Cecil Dixon at CricketArchive

1903 births
1973 deaths
People from Duns, Scottish Borders
Sportspeople from the Scottish Borders
Scottish cricketers
Hampshire cricketers